Frontier FiberOptic (formerly known as Frontier FiOS or FiOS from Frontier) is a bundled Internet access, telephone, and television service that operates over a fiber-optic communications network in California, Texas, Florida, Indiana, and South Carolina. Service is offered in some areas of the United States by Frontier Communications in areas built out and formerly served by Verizon, using the same infrastructure as its Fios service. Other service providers often use fiber optics in the network backbone and existing copper or coax infrastructure for residential users. Frontier's service began in 2009 with the acquisition of portions of Verizon's network, and networked areas expanded through 2015 through similar acquisitions, although some areas do not have service or cannot receive TV and phone service because of franchise agreements.

History

In May 2009, Frontier announced that it would acquire Verizon Communications' 4.8 million landlines leased to residential and small business customers in Arizona, Idaho, Illinois, Indiana, Michigan, Nevada, North Carolina, Ohio, Oregon, South Carolina, Washington, West Virginia, and Wisconsin, for $8.6 billion. In addition to the purchase of copper lines, Frontier also acquired the fiber-optic system built by Verizon in Fort Wayne, around Portland, and in some eastern suburbs of Seattle. These operations would continue to operate under the FiOS branding used by Verizon. 

Frontier initially stated that it had no plans for changes after the transition. However, the company later attempted to institute a $500 installation fee for new television subscribers, backed out of franchise agreements in some cities in Oregon, and increased rates by 50% in Indiana. Frontier later retracted the rate increases and installation fee but has not reclaimed franchises in the cities that it relinquished and not before losing FiOS TV subscribers.

On February 5, 2015, Frontier announced that it would also acquire Verizon's wireline assets in California, Florida and Texas for $10.5 billion. The transition took effect April 1, 2016; technical issues with the integration resulted in a disruption of service for many FiOS users in the markets, which continued for some in the weeks that followed. In May 2016, California assemblyman Mike Gatto announced a hearing over the matter, stating that "there has been an alarming rate of telephone and Internet outages in Southern California and consumers are frustrated with the lack of a solution to this months-long ordeal". 

During the hearing, Frontier West president Melinda White stated that most of the issues were caused by incomplete customer data provided by Verizon for importation into its systems. White stated that less than 1 percent of its customers were affected, and that it would provide service credits to affected subscribers while it finished addressing the issues. Republican assemblyman Jim Patterson accused the California Public Utilities Commission (CPUC) of not placing enough oversight on the transition, deeming it a "failure of the fundamental role and responsibility" of the commission.

In May 2020, Frontier completed a sale of its assets in the Pacific Northwest to Ziply Fiber including the fiber-optic systems that it had acquired from Verizon in Washington and Oregon.

In late 2020, Frontier dropped the FiOS branding, renaming the service Frontier FiberOptic.

References

External links
 

Cable television companies of the United States
Internet service providers of the United States
Broadband
Fiber to the premises
Video on demand
2009 establishments in the United States
Frontier Communications